The men's 60 metres event  at the 1980 European Athletics Indoor Championships was held on 1 March in Sindelfingen.

Medalists

Results

Heats
First 3 from each heat (Q) and the next 3 fastest (q) qualified for the semifinals.

Semifinals
First 3 from each semifinal qualified directly (Q) for the final.

Final

References

60 metres at the European Athletics Indoor Championships
60